Big Twist is an outdoor 1978 bronze sculpture by American artist Bryan Hunt, installed at the Museum of Fine Arts, Houston's Lillie and Hugh Roy Cullen Sculpture Garden, in the U.S. state of Texas.

See also

 1978 in art
 List of public art in Houston

References

1978 establishments in Texas
1978 sculptures
Bronze sculptures in Texas
Lillie and Hugh Roy Cullen Sculpture Garden
Sculptures by American artists